Blue Hour is a collaboration album by jazz saxophonist Stanley Turrentine and The Three Sounds recorded for the Blue Note label and performed by Turrentine with Gene Harris, Andrew Simpkins and Bill Dowdy. The album was reissued in 2000 with an additional disc of unreleased recordings, as Blue Hour: The Complete Sessions (Blue Note 24586).

Reception

The Allmusic review by Ken Dryden awarded the 2000 2CD Reissue 3 stars and describes it as "a very relaxed and bluesy release".  The original album was awarded 4½ stars by Michael Erlewine of Allmusic.

Track listing
Original LP

 "I Want a Little Girl" (Murray Mencher, Billy Moll) – 7:03
 "Gee Baby, Ain't I Good to You" (Andy Razaf, Don Redman) – 5:20
 "Blue Riff" (Gene Harris) – 6:26
 "Since I Fell for You" (Buddy Johnson) – 8:46
 "Willow Weep for Me" (Ann Ronell) – 9:55

Bonus tracks on Blue Hour: The Complete Sessions CD 2:
 "Blues in the Closet" (Pettiford) – 5:00
 "Just in Time" (Comden, Green, Styne) – 5:40
 "Gee Baby, Ain't I Good to You" [Alternate Take] – 5:33
 "Where or When" (Hart, Rodgers) – 7:00
 "Blue Hour" (Gene Harris) – 5:14
 "There Is No Greater Love" (Jones, Symes) – 8:24
 "Alone Together" (Dietz, Schwartz) – 4:40
 "Strike up the Band" (George Gershwin, Ira Gershwin) – 5:24

Recorded on December 16, 1960 (original LP & CD 2 tracks 1–3) and June 29, 1960 (CD 2 tracks 4–8).

Personnel
Stanley Turrentine – tenor saxophone
Gene Harris – piano
Andrew Simpkins – bass
Bill Dowdy – drums

Production
 Alfred Lion – producer
 Reid Miles – design
 Rudy Van Gelder – audio engineer
 Francis Wolff – photography

References

Stanley Turrentine albums
1961 albums
The Three Sounds albums
Blue Note Records albums
Albums produced by Alfred Lion
Albums recorded at Van Gelder Studio